The A. B. Brown Generating Station is a four-unit, 700 megawatt (MW) power plant, located on the northern bank of Ohio River,  east of Mount Vernon, Indiana and  southwest of Evansville, Indiana just west of the Posey-Vanderburgh County Line. Each of the two coal-fired units has a name-plate capacity of 265.2 MW. Bituminous coal is used as a primary fuel type, which can be substituted for natural gas. There are also two gas turbine units, 88.2 MW of nameplate capacity each. The facility is owned by Centerpoint Energy (formerly Vectren, preceded by Southern Indiana Gas and Electric Company). Vectren announced a plan to retire the plant in 2023 and replace it with a natural gas power plant; however, this plan needs to be approved by the Indiana Utility Regulatory Commission.

Environmental impact

Emission control
In 1979, Unit 1 was constructed with a dual-alkali scrubber to help reduce sulphur dioxide emissions. In 1986, Unit 2 was completed and also uses a dual-alkali scrubber. From 2001 to 2005, Vectren installed four selective catalytic reduction (SCR) devices on all of the coal-fired units, which successfully cut nitrogen oxide emissions by 80 percent. In 2004, Vectren replaced an existing electrostatic precipitator at Unit 1 with a fabric filter. The investment increased the particulate matter removal efficiency to 99 percent at that unit.

Ash ponds
The ash pond consists of two dams. The Lower dam (built in 1978) has been classified by the Indiana DNR as a Significant Hazard (State ID#65-7, permit #D-4405, rev 1). The Upper dam (constructed in two phases in 2002 and 2007) was not classified, but has a permit #FW-21909. Liquid wastes being sluiced into the pond include fly ash, bottom ash, boiler slag, FGD belt filter wash down and water sump wastes, pyrites, material removed from the coal pile run-off pond, plant floor drain wash downs, boiler chemical leaning wastes, reverse osmosis system rejects, and rainfall/runoff from the surrounding area. According to Vectren, no discernible amount of material has been removed from the pond since it first began operation in 1978.

See also

 List of power stations in Indiana

References

External links 
 Data on generation and fuel consumption from the Energy Information Administration Electricity Data Browser

Energy infrastructure completed in 1979
Energy infrastructure completed in 1986
Energy infrastructure completed in 1991
Energy infrastructure completed in 2002
Buildings and structures in Posey County, Indiana
Coal-fired power stations in Indiana
Natural gas-fired power stations in Indiana
1979 establishments in Indiana